The act abolishing the kingship was an Act of the Rump Parliament that abolished the monarchy in England in the aftermath of the Second English Civil War.

In the days following the execution of Charles I on 30 January 1649, Parliament debated the form that any future government should take. On 7 February, Parliament voted down the idea of continuing the monarchy and the act to abolish the office of King was formally passed on 17 March.

On 8 May 1660, the Convention Parliament proclaimed Charles II to have been lawful king of England since his father's death, leading to the restoration of the monarchy.

Notably, there is a lack of kingship in parliamentary records. This has caused some historians to speculate its lack of importance. On the other hand, Eric Porter, a lecturer of RMIT university speculates that this may have occurred due to vying interests at the time.

References

External links
Full text of the Act

1649 in England
1649 in law
Acts of the Parliament of England